Economic strategy may refer to:

 Marketing strategy
 Strategic management
 Economic policy
 Industrial policy